Settles may refer to:

 Gene Settles (born 1953), American football defensive linebacker
 Ron Settles (1959-1981), American football running back
 Tawambi Settles (born 1976), American football player
 Tony Settles (born 1964), American former football linebacker
 Settles Hotel, a disused historic 15-story hotel in Big Spring, Texas

See also
 Settle (disambiguation)